Wallace & Gromit in Project Zoo is a platform video game developed by Frontier Developments and published by BAM! Entertainment (European distribution being handled by Acclaim Entertainment) for the GameCube, PlayStation 2, Xbox and Microsoft Windows. It is the first console game to feature Aardman Animations' characters Wallace and Gromit and also features the voice of Wallace, Peter Sallis reprising his role.

Gameplay
As Gromit, the player must use Wallace's bizarre inventions - including the Porridge Gun, Turnip Launcher, Springy Boots, and Gyrocopter - to battle Feathers McGraw's robotic minions and rescue the baby animals in typical platform game style.

Story
Wallace and Gromit have adopted Archie; a baby polar bear at the local zoo. However, when they go to the zoo to celebrate his birthday, they find the zoo padlocked and supposedly under new management. They soon discover that Feathers McGraw (the villain from The Wrong Trousers) is now running the zoo and has kidnapped Archie. Back at home, Wallace and Gromit design a giant wooden penguin (a parody of the Trojan Horse) which gets them inside the zoo.
Entering the jungle house, they find that Feathers has captured baby elephants to force their parents to work for him. To help Gromit, Wallace fashions a telescope into a banana gun as the first weapon of the game. Upon rescuing the first baby elephant, the parents push down a set of doors allowing them access to the next area. Upon making their way to the temple, the duo are almost flattened by a rolling boulder trap, but it is able to smash a way out for them. In the Temple, Gromit also gains a new tool of a torch, allowing him to illuminate areas or light fuses. After repairing a panel damaged by the boulder, Wallace finds an entrance to a mine where Gromit must battle a mole machine in the first boss fight of the game with the aid of Wallace's Go-Higher Springy Boots. After the mole machine is destroyed, Feathers escapes underground. Wallace sees a poster nearby denoting a countdown to D-Day, which he finds odd.

Travelling underground, Wallace and Gromit are briefly separated, forcing Gromit to navigate mining machinery and mine cart tracks. It also turns out Feathers has imprisoned baby beavers to force their parents to work. Upon Gromit freeing the first baby beaver, Wallace finds himself trapped on a bridge, so Gromit must detonate explosives to free him. Upon doing this, Wallace repairs the lift leading them to a large cave where Gromit must free two other beavers, in the process gaining a new weapon of a Porridge gun. Wallace discovers drainage, along with Feathers flying a helicopter so quickly engineers a Gyro-Copter, allowing them to give chase to the Volcanic sector. Upon being cornered by the duo, Feathers drops them through a trapdoor into a flooded room where they are nearly crushed before Gromit unlocks the door.
After obtaining the new tool of a fire extinguisher, the duo are briefly get separated again, with Gromit needing to navigate around lava, fire and enemies before they are reunited and find imprisoned baby gorillas who Gromit is soon able to free. In appreciation, the gorillas open up the lift, allowing them further access.
Eventually, after freeing all three gorillas, Wallace and Gromit find their way back to the Gyro-Copter, where they see Feathers activating some machinery.

Using the Gyro-copter and the porridge gun, they gum up the machinery and Feathers uses an escape pod to flee, which they follow, eventually crash landing in a warehouse.
Inside the warehouse, they find Feathers has captured baby pandas and must deal with enemies, machinery and goons to free them. In the process, Wallace also builds the last main weapon of the game; a high velocity turnip launcher. After eventually finding Feathers and Archie, Feathers cuts the lights, allowing him to escape to the Polar exhibit, where he has captured 3 baby polar bears, with one of them having to be rescued by activating 3 steam valves to produce hot water needed to melt the ice. Eventually, Wallace soups up a pedlo boat with a turnip launcher. After obtaining Feathers' remote control, Wallace accidentally activates Feathers' submarine, forcing Gromit to destroy it and icebergs in a parody of Asteroids (video game).

Wallace and Gromit then enter the last set of levels in the game, finding Feathers has created a Diamond-O-Matic to create diamonds, reminding Wallace of the D-Day poster. Archie accidentally gets sent into the machine, and Gromit must enter the machine, using weapons and tools collected from throughout the game and protect Archie from various threats such as fire and ice, whilst also freeing 3 baby zebras. Eventually, they are able to rescue Archie and go to confront Feathers.
In the final boss fight of the game, Wallace is imprisoned in a cell and Gromit must battle Feathers in a giant robot suit, avoiding attacks and then shooting the robot in either the bottom or the eyes with a turnip launcher when vulnerable.
Upon the robot being defeated, Wallace is freed from his cell and Feathers activates a rocket pack to escape. However, upon reaching the zoo entrance, Feathers is confronted by the parent beavers, pandas, polar bears and zebras before being caged by the elephants and dropping his diamond, which is swiftly picked up by Gromit. Wallace then notes how Feathers won't be troubling them again in a hurry, with the penguin being back in his cell from the end of the Wrong Trousers.

Reception

Wallace & Gromit in Project Zoo received "mixed or average reviews" on all platforms according to the review aggregation website Metacritic.

References

External links

2003 video games
3D platform games
Frontier Developments games
GameCube games
PlayStation 2 games
Video games set in Lancashire
Video games set in zoos
Project Zoo
Windows games
Xbox games
Single-player video games
Video games scored by Alastair Lindsay
Video games developed in the United Kingdom